Cao Lãnh is a district in Đồng Tháp province. The district capital lies at Mỹ Thọ township, 8 km southeast of Cao Lãnh City.

Divisions
The district is divided into 1 township and 17 rural communes, including:
 Mỹ Thọ township
 An Bình
 Ba Sao
 Bình Hàng Tây
 Bình Hàng Trung
 Bình Thạnh
 Gáo Giồng
 Mỹ Hiệp
 Mỹ Hội
 Mỹ Long
 Mỹ Thọ
 Mỹ Xương
 Nhị Mỹ
 Phong Mỹ
 Phương Thịnh
 Phương Trà
 Tân Hội Trung
 Tân Nghĩa

References

Districts of Đồng Tháp province